The Moldo Too is a range in the inner Tien Shan, Kyrgyzstan. The length of the range is approximately 110 km and the width - 26 km. The average altitude is about 3,600 m and the highest peak - 4,185 m. The range is mainly composed of sedimentary rocks of Middle Paleozoic.

References

Mountain ranges of Kyrgyzstan
Mountain ranges of the Tian Shan